Vedette may refer to:
Vedette (sentry), a cavalry sentry or outpost, or a small naval patrol boat used for scouting
Vedette mail, military mail carried by vedettes
Vedette (cabaret), a French term equivalent to lead showgirl or pop icon
Vedette (album), a 2000 album by Argentine rock group Babasónicos
Canadian Vickers Vedette, a Canadian-built biplane
Vedette Shapewear, brand name for a manufacturer of shapewear, lingerie, and corsets
Ford Vedette, a Ford France car model from 1948 to 1954
Simca Vedette, a Simca car model from 1954 to 1961
, the name of more than one United States Navy ship
Vedette (horse) (foaled 1854), a British Thoroughbred racehorse that won the 2000 Guineas Stakes and two Doncaster Cups.
Vedette côtière de surveillance maritime, a class of patrol boats of the French Maritime Gendarmerie

See also 
Vidette (disambiguation)